Peter F. Rafferty (1845-1910) was an American soldier, who served as a private in the Union Army. He received the Medal of Honor after being injured in the Battle of Malvern Hill.

Biography 
Peter Rafferty was born June 12, 1845, in County Tyrone, Ireland. He moved to the United States as a teenager.  and would later enlist in the Union Army on October 22, 1861 in New York City. He was attached to the 69th New York Infantry and was a member of the Irish Brigade.

Only July 1st, 1862 his regiment with the 88th New York Volunteer Infantry Regiment were at Malvern Hill, Virginia. Their units were ordered to stop an advancing unit of Confederate troops. During the battle he was wounded in the thigh. After regrouping he stayed with his unit, the Irish Brigade. He was wounded a second time and suffered injuries to his foot and to the face by two musket balls. He was captured by the Confederate army but did not receive any medical care for five days.  He was later released in a prisoner exchange.

He was discharged on January 5, 1863 due to his injuries which left him with a fractured lower jaw and clavicle. In 1864, he re-enlisted in the Sixth District of Columbia Volunteers and became a lieutenant.

He died on April 30, 1910 and was buried at the Calvary Cemetery in Woodside, New York.

Medal of Honor citation 
Rank and Organization:

Rank and organization: Private, 69th New York Infantry. Place and date: Malvern Hill, Virginia, USA, July 1, 1862. Entered service at: New York, N.Y. Born: June 12, 1845, Ireland. Date of issue: August 2, 1897.

Citation:

The President of the United States of America, in the name of Congress, takes pleasure in presenting the Medal of Honor to Private Peter F. Rafferty, United States Army, for extraordinary heroism on 1 July 1862, while serving with Company B, 69th New York Infantry, in action at Malvern Hill, Virginia. Having been wounded and directed to the rear, Private Rafferty declined to go, but continued in action, receiving several additional wounds, which resulted in his capture by the enemy and his total disability for military service.

See also 
 69th Infantry Regiment (New York)
 List of American Civil War Medal of Honor recipients
 Medal of Honor

References 

1845 births
1910 deaths
19th-century Irish people
American Civil War recipients of the Medal of Honor
American people of Irish descent
Irish emigrants to the United States (before 1923)
Irish-born Medal of Honor recipients
Irish soldiers in the United States Army
Union Army soldiers
Union Army officers

External links 
 History of the Sixty-Ninth Regiment (“The Fighting 69th”)
 Home of Heroes - Civil War Medal of Honor Recipients
 Union Defeat and an Irish Medal of Honor at the End of the Seven Days